The Upper Nihotupu Reservoir (or Upper Nihotupu Dam) is one of five reservoirs in the Waitākere Ranges that supply water to Auckland, New Zealand. Completed in 1923, the concrete gravity dam and its reservoir are managed by Watercare Services, a council-owned company.

Construction

After the 1898 droughts, an alternative to the Western Springs pumping station was investigated, with the Waitākere Ranges considered the best option for Auckland. In 1902, wooden dams were placed at Nihotupu and neighbouring Quinns Creek, which were demolished by 1914.

The dam was tendered in 1915, and a contract awarded to Gisborne firm Langlands and Company. During the construction of the tramline between the construction side and the wharf at Big Muddy Creek, a freak accident occurred during blasting, when a rock flew 100m into the site office, killing contractor William Langlands. Construction was slow, due to the high rainfall and flooding in the area, and the lack of labour and resources due to the outbreak of World War I, however construction eventually finished in 1923.

Tourism
The Nihotupu area and the picturesque Nihotupu Falls were a tourist attraction in the late 19th century before the dam for the reservoir was built.

A bush tram that was built during the construction of the dam and its water pipeline was  used for the Watercare-run "Rainforest Express" tourist excursions.  As at November 2014, the RFE is closed by Watercare until further notice along with the closure of the Waitakere Tramline simultaneously, by Watercare. Please enquire with Watercare for further information or look up Waitakere Tramline and NZ Regional Trains on Facebook. The dam was the end point of the trips from Jacobson's Depot and can also be reached by walking track access from Piha Road. Steep steps lead up the face of the dam.

References

Buildings and structures in the Auckland Region
Waitākere Ranges Local Board Area
Reservoirs in New Zealand
Lakes of the Auckland Region
1920s architecture in New Zealand
Waitākere Ranges
West Auckland, New Zealand